Vultures is the third album (second officially released) by American alternative rock/post-grunge music group Smile Empty Soul. The album was released on October 24, 2006 via Bieler Bros. Records. The album has sold 70,000 units.

Track listing 

"Hollywood" is embedded with "Vultures" as a hidden track and begins at 18:30.

Personnel
 Sean Danielsen – vocals, lead guitar
 Ryan Martin – bass guitar
 Jake Kilmer – drums
 Mike Booth – rhythm guitar

References

External links
 

2006 albums
Smile Empty Soul albums
Bieler Bros. Records albums